was a private junior college at Machida city, Tokyo in Japan.

History 
The Tamagawa Gakuen Junior College for Women General Education section was founded in 1965. The Child Care department was added in 1967, and was renamed as the infantile education department in 1984.

The advanced course education major was set up in 1994. The college stopped taking new students in 2002, and was abolished and integrated into Tamagawa University in 2004.

Subjects 
 General Education Section 
 Infantile education department

Advanced course 
 General Education major

Universities and colleges in Tokyo
Educational institutions established in 1965
Japanese junior colleges
Private universities and colleges in Japan
1965 establishments in Japan